The Burke River, a watercourse that is part of the Nepean River catchment, is located in the Southern Highlands of New South Wales, Australia.

The Burke River rises on the western slopes of Macquarie Pass, below Mount Murray, and flows generally to the north, before reaching its confluence with the Nepean River, as it is impounded by Lake Nepean. The river descends  over its  course.

The river flows within the Water Supply Reserve of Greater Sydney.

See also 

 List of rivers of New South Wales (A–K)
 List of rivers of Australia
 Rivers of New South Wales

References 

Rivers of New South Wales
Southern Highlands (New South Wales)